Pierer is a German language surname. Notable people with the name include:
 Heinrich August Pierer (1794–1850), German lexicographer and publisher
 Heinrich von Pierer (born 1941), German manager

References 

German-language surnames
Surnames of Austrian origin